Prince Gong (1833–1898), born Aisin-Gioro Yixin, was a Qing dynasty prince and the sixth son of the Daoguang Emperor

Prince Gong may also refer to:

Han dynasty
 Prince Gong of Liang, born Liu Mai, a grandson of Emperor Wen of Han
 Prince Gong of Lu, born Liu Yu, a son of Emperor Wu of Han

Three Kingdoms period
 Prince Gong of Chenliu, born Cao Jun, a son of Cao Cao of Wei during the Three Kingdoms period

Tang dynasty
 Prince Gong of Pu, born Li Tai, a son of Emperor Taizong of Tang

Qing dynasty
 Prince Gong (peerage), the Qing dynasty princely peerage associated with Changning and Yixin's family lines
 Changning (prince), Qing dynasty prince and first bearer of the Prince Gong title

See also
 King Gong (disambiguation)
 Prince Gong Mansion, Yixin's former home, now a museum in Beijing, China